Nemerov is a Russian surname. It may refer to
 Howard Nemerov, Pulitzer Prize winner and American poet laureate
 Alexander Nemerov, Professor of Art and Art History at Stanford University
 Alexander Nemerov (character), a fictional character Tom Clancy's The Sum of All Fears
Diane Nemerov, the maiden name of Diane Arbus

See also
 Nemyriv (town)